The gray flying fox (Pteropus griseus) is a species of flying fox in the family Pteropodidae. It is not to be confused with the grey flying fox (Pteropus poliocephalus). It is found in Indonesia, but not in the Philippines, despite occasional reference to such. Very little is known about this species. The gray flying fox has small size and neutral coloration with a brownish head and an orange abdomen. It probably roosts individually or in small groups.  It was listed on appendix II of CITES, and is classified as "Data Deficient" by the IUCN. This species has been decimated by hunting for bushmeat in Indonesia.
The hunters use fishing hooks, ropes, and other supplies to hunt the bats. The ropes and hooks are placed along their flight paths, tearing and ensnaring the bats' wings when are flying. In the course of a hunting season, entire colonies can be killed.

Taxonomy 
The species was first described in 1810 by Étienne Geoffroy Saint-Hilaire, using a specimen obtained on Timor during a French scientific expedition. Geoffroy's assignment of the species to the genus Pteropus has remained current.

Ecology 
Specimens of Pteropus griseus have been found to be infested with Cyclopodia horsfieldi, a species of Nycteribiidae fly.
Flying foxes have important ecosystem roles as seed dispersers and pollinators because the only extant animals capable of dispersing large seeds within 30mm diameter long distances.

References

Pteropus
Bats of Indonesia
Endemic fauna of Indonesia
Fauna of the Lesser Sunda Islands
Mammals described in 1810
Bats as food
Taxonomy articles created by Polbot